Taekwondo was inducted at the Youth Olympic Games at the inaugural edition in 2010.

Summary

Medal table
As of the 2018 Summer Youth Olympics.

See also
Taekwondo at the Summer Olympics

External links
Youth Olympic Games

 
Youth Olympics
Taekwondo